Sonia Mishal is a Pakistani actress. She is known for her roles in drama serials Ishqaaway (2015), Dumpukht Aatish-e-Ishq (2016), and Khasara (2018).

Early life 
Born in Karachi, Pakistan, Sonia grew up in Doha, Qatar, and attended school there throughout her early years.

Filmography

Television

References

External links
 

Living people
21st-century Pakistani actresses
1993 births